NRTA may mean:
Nantucket Regional Transit Authority
National Retired Teachers Association; a retired teachers insurance organization that today is now the AARP. 
National Radio and Television Administration